Gloria Brame (born August 20, 1955) is an American sexologist, writer and sex therapist based in Athens, Georgia. She is a member of the American College of Sexologists, and clinical sexologist. Her sex therapy practice specializes in consensual BDSM, sexual fetishism and sexual dysfunction.

Dr. Brame is also an author, educator, and advocate for safe, sane, and consensual relating, especially among the BDSM, fetish, and LGBTQ communities.

Education
Brame earned her PhD degree in Human Sexuality from the Institute for Advanced Study of Human Sexuality in 2000 and an M.A. in English literature from Columbia University in 1978.

Career
Brame wrote several books, including:
 Different Loving: the World of Sexual Dominance and Submission
 Come Hither: A Commonsense Guide To Kinky Sex

Different Loving, published in 1993, was an evidence based re-evaluation of SM/fetish/kink as an expression of normal minds and lives, challenging the bias against safe, sane, and consensual behavior as somehow pathological or problematic.

Come Hither was selected as the "official guide to kinky sex" by the Institute for Advanced Study of Human Sexuality.

Other titles by Brame include: Sex for Grown-Ups, Where the Boys Are, The Truth About Sex (Vols. I and II), and Different Loving Too.

Brame testified against then-US Attorney General in Nitke vs Ashcroft, a major case challenging the Communications Decency Act before the Southern District of New York.

In 2012 Brame joined the board of directors of the Woodhull Sexual Freedom Alliance and co-hosted a web radio talk show on Spreaker.

Brame has been cited as a fetish sex expert in a number of media articles, and has been a regular contributor to Cosmopolitan, Working Woman, and other mainstream magazines. Her biography of the Marquis de Sade appears in International Encyclopedia of Human Sexuality (2015).

Brame is on the board of governors for the Leather Hall of Fame.

Internet presence
Brame has interacted with  professional BDSM/Fetish blogs on Reddit.com. She also hosted the Gloria Brame Show (podcast) on BlogTalkRadio and Spreaker, with focus on sexual freedoms and BDSM/LGBTQ rights.

Media
Brame has given numerous live-radio and television interviews with BBC, CBS, NBC, CNBC, FOX, PBS and foreign media. She has been cited in numerous magazines and newspapers, including a 2004 profile in The Washington Post.

Teaching
2002 – 2015, professor at the Institute for Advanced Study of Human Sexuality.

1987 – 1991, adjunct professor of English, NYU, guest lecturer in creative writing, York College (CUNY), associate professor of poetry and creative writing, Hofstra.

Awards and associations
One of the "10 Best Sex and Dating Experts," by DatingAdvice.com

National Leather Association International Cynthia Slater Non-Fiction Article Award (2010) for "Transformation and Transcendence in BDSM"

American College of Sexologists

Bisexuality-Aware Professionals Directory Directory of Therapists Experienced in the Treatment Of Transgender Persons.

Lesbian Business Community MediAngels Global E-Hospital Open Relationship Resources Psychology Today Therapist Directory

Works

Bibliography

Filmography

References

External links

 

1955 births
American non-fiction writers
American relationships and sexuality writers
American sexologists
BDSM writers
Columbia Graduate School of Arts and Sciences alumni
Institute for Advanced Study of Human Sexuality alumni
Living people
Women erotica writers
American women non-fiction writers
21st-century American women